Jane Belson may refer to:

 Jane Conger Belson Shimané (1927–2002), experimental filmmaker
 Jane Belson, lawyer and wife of Douglas Adams